Mâni is a form of Turkish folk song in  quatrains.

References

Turkish music